Joseph Yates may refer to:

 Joseph Yates (judge) (1722–1770), English judge
 Joseph C. Yates (1768–1837), American lawyer, politician and founding trustee of Union College
 Joseph Brooks Yates (1780–1855), English merchant and antiquary
 Joseph Yates (cricketer) (1844–1916), English cricketer and lawyer